Susqueda Reservoir is a reservoir located on the Ter river, near Osor, Catalonia, Spain. The dam is located in Osor while the main water body is within the boundaries of Susqueda and Sant Hilari Sacalm. The construction of the dam was completed in 1968, creating a reservoir with a storage capacity of 233 hm³ that covered the old villages of Susqueda and Querós. The dam has a structural height of 135 m and a crest length of 360 m.

See also
List of dams and reservoirs in Catalonia

References

External links
Susqueda Official Website 
Weekly storage summary of Pantà de Susqueda 

Reservoirs in Catalonia
Selva